New Madrid County Central is a secondary school located in New Madrid County, Missouri. It serves grades 912 and is located just outside Howardville, Missouri. The school serves to a majority of New Madrid County, except for Risco High School, Portageville High School, and Gideon High School. The school became county-wide in 1980 when New Madrid, Lilbourn, and Parma High Schools (Matthews joined in 1983) all combined making New Madrid County Central High School. The district consists of one middle school, which is located on the same 60+ acre campus that the high school is on, and three elementary schools which are located in New Madrid, Lilbourn, and Matthews.

The high school principal is Justin Poley.

Notable alumni
Kony Ealy 2010, NFL Player
Gabriel Garmon 2011, Fashion Designer/Stylist
Shayla Day 1999, Actress (Empire, Boss, The Dark Knight, Chicago PD)

References

External links

New Madrid County R-1 School District

Public high schools in Missouri
Schools in New Madrid County, Missouri